Bezymyanny (masculine), Bezymyannaya (feminine), or Bezymyannoye (neuter) is the name of several inhabited localities in Russia. The name literally means "nameless".

Urban localities
Bezymyanny, Sakha Republic, an urban-type settlement in Aldansky District of the Sakha Republic

Rural localities
Bezymyanny, Novosibirsk Oblast, a settlement in Kuybyshevsky District of Novosibirsk Oblast
Bezymyanny, Orenburg Oblast, a settlement in Zelenodolsky Selsoviet of Kvarkensky District of Orenburg Oblast
Bezymyanny, Rostov Oblast, a khutor in Leninskoye Rural Settlement of Zimovnikovsky District of Rostov Oblast
Bezymyanny, Voronezh Oblast, a khutor in Peskovskoye Rural Settlement of Pavlovsky District of Voronezh Oblast
Bezymyannoye, Amur Oblast, a selo in Raychikhinsky Rural Settlement of Bureysky District of Amur Oblast
Bezymyannoye, Krasnodar Krai, a selo in Bezymyanny Rural Okrug of Goryachy Klyuch, Krasnodar Krai
Bezymyannoye, Saratov Oblast, a selo in Engelssky District of Saratov Oblast
Bezymyannoye, Smolensk Oblast, a village in Kaydakovskoye Rural Settlement of Vyazemsky District of Smolensk Oblast
Bezymyannaya, Omsk Oblast, a village in Krasnoyarsky Rural Okrug of Bolsherechensky District of Omsk Oblast
Bezymyannaya, Vologda Oblast, a village in Naumovsky Selsoviet of Verkhovazhsky District of Vologda Oblast